Altinote is a genus of butterflies from South America of the subfamily Heliconiinae in the family Nymphalidae. For taxonomic problems regarding this group, see Acraea.

Species
Listed alphabetically within groups:

neleus species group
Altinote alcione (Hewitson, 1852)
Altinote neleus (Latreille, [1813])
Altinote stratonice (Latreille, [1813])
ozomene species group:
Altinote anaxo (Hopffer, 1874)
Altinote callianthe (C. & R. Felder, 1862)
Altinote dicaeus (Latreille, [1817]) – red-banded altinote
Altinote eresia (C. & R. Felder, 1862)
Altinote griseata (Butler, 1873)
Altinote hilaris (Jordan, 1910)
Altinote momina (Jordan, 1910) – Jordan's altinote
Altinote negra (C. & R. Felder, 1862) – gaudy altinote
Altinote ozomene (Godart, 1819) – lamplight altinote
Altinote stratonice Latreille, 1813 – Latreille's altinote, orange-disked altinote
Altinote tenebrosa (Hewitson, 1868)
Altinote trinacria (C. & R. Felder, 1862)
unknown species group:
Altinote rubrocellulata (Hayward, 1960)

References

Acraeini
Nymphalidae of South America
Nymphalidae genera